Erkinjon Tulkinovich Isakov (Cyrillic: Эркинжон Тулкинович Исаков; born 25 November 1974) is a retired Uzbekistani athlete who competed in the 400 metres hurdles before moving up to middle distance events. He twice represented his country at the Olympic Games, in 2000 and 2004, failing to advance to the semifinals.

Before 2000 he represented Russia.

Competition record

Personal bests
Outdoor
800 metres – 1:46.98 (Bishkek 2004) NR
1500 metres – 3:47.48 (Tula 2003)
400 metres hurdles – 50.11 (Bangkok 2000)
Indoor
800 metres – 1:47.97 (Tashkent 2001) NR
1000 metres – 2:25.02 (Moscow 2006) NR
1500 metres – 3:54.56 (Volgograd 2005)

References

1974 births
Living people
Uzbekistani male hurdlers
Uzbekistani male middle-distance runners
Athletes (track and field) at the 2000 Summer Olympics
Athletes (track and field) at the 2004 Summer Olympics
Athletes (track and field) at the 2002 Asian Games
Olympic athletes of Uzbekistan
Asian Games competitors for Uzbekistan